André Bailly (11 February 1942 – 22 February 2023) was a Belgian politician. A member of the Socialist Party, he served in the Parliament of Wallonia from 2001 to 2004.

Bailly died in Verviers on 22 February 2023, at the age of 81.

References

1942 births
2023 deaths
21st-century Belgian politicians
Members of the Parliament of the French Community
Members of the Parliament of Wallonia
People from Verviers
Socialist Party (Belgium) politicians